Bhimashankar is located in the Ghat region of the Sahyadri Mountains. Bhimashankar temple is among the twelve Jyotirlingas situated all over India. It is located in the village of Bhojgiri, 50 km northwest of Khed taluka (alias Rajgurunagar), near Pune, in Maharashtra, India. Bhīmāshankar is also the source of the river Bhima, which flows southeast and merges with the Krishna river near Raichur.

Maharashtra has three Jyotirlingas: Bhimashankar, Trimbakeshwar and Grishneshwar.

Jyotirlinga
As per the Shiv Mahapuran, once Brahma (the Hindu God for creation) and Vishnu (the Hindu God for protection) had an argument about creation. To test them, Shiva pierced the three worlds with a huge, endless pillar of light, the Jyotirlinga. Vishnu and Brahma split their ways to search downwards and upwards, respectively, to find the end of the light in either direction. Brahma lied and said he found out where it ends, while Vishnu accepted defeat. Shiva showed up as the second pillar of light and cursed Brahma, telling him that he would never be included in ceremonies again while Vishnu would be worshipped forever. The Jyotirlinga is the supreme, partless reality, out of which Shiva partly appears. The Jyotirlinga shrines, thus, are places where Shiva appeared as a fiery column of light.

The twelve Jyotirlinga sites are named after the god who lives there, and each one is seen as a different form of Shiva.

At all of these places, the main image is a lingam, which stands for the endless stambha pillar and represents Shiva's endless nature.

The twelve Jyotirlinga are Somnath in Gujarat, Mallikarjuna at Srisailam in Andhra Pradesh, Mahakaleswar at Ujjain in Madhya Pradesh, Omkareshwar in Madhya Pradesh, Kedarnath in Himalayas, Bhīmāshankar in Maharashtra, Viswanath at Varanasi in Uttar Pradesh, Triambakeshwar in Maharashtra, Vaidyanath in Jharkhand, Aundha Nagnath at Aundha in Maharashtra, Rameshwar at Rameswaram in Tamil Nadu and Grishneshwar in Maharashtra.

Architecture

The sanctum of the Bhimashankar Temple is on a lower level and is made up of both old and new Nagara-style buildings. It demonstrates the exceptional craftsmanship of ancient Vishwakarma sculptors. The temple dates from the 13th century. In the 18th century, Nana Phadnavis built the Sabhamandap. He also designed and built the shikhara. The Maratha King Chattrapati Shivaji Maharaj endowed this temple to facilitate religious ceremonies.

As far back as the 13th century CE, people wrote about the Bhimashankaram shrine and the Bhimarathi river. It is reported that Saint Jnaneshwar visited Tryambakeshwar and Bhimashankar. A Roman-style bell may be found in front of the temple. Chimaji Appa donated this big bell.

On 16 May 1739 Chimaji Appa amassed five big bells following his victory over the Portuguese from the Vasai Fort. He offered one here at Bhimashankar and the others in Menavali near Wai in front of a Shiva temple on the banks of the Krishna River, the Banshanker Temple in Pune, the Omkareshwar Temple in Pune, and the Ramlinga Temple in Pune (Shirur).

Surroundings
There are Buddha-style carvings of Amba-Ambika, Bhootling, and Bhimashankar in the hills of Manmaad near Bhimashankar at a height of 1034 metres. A big bell in the Hemadpanthi structure built by Nana Phadanavis is a feature of Bhimashankar. Places that can be visited in the vicinity include Hanuman Lake, Gupt Bhimashankar, the origin of the River Bhima, Nag Phani, Bombay Point, and Sākshi Vinayak. Bhimashankar is a forest reserve of 130.78 km2 that was declared a wildlife sanctuary in 1985. This sanctuary is a part of the Western Ghats, so it is rich in floral and faunal diversity. A variety of birds, animals, insects, and plants can be seen. A rare animal, the Malabar giant squirrel, locally called "Shekaru," can be found in the deep woods. The Bhorgiri fort is close to Bhimashankar.

Other temples and shrines
There is a shrine known as Kalmaja near the Bhimashankar temple. Kalamaja is a goddess dedicated to a tree named Kalamb. She is a goddess of the local tribes. Hinduism has had a big impact on this area, so there are many stories about her.

The Mokshakund tirtha is behind the Bhimashankar temple, and it is associated with the rishi Kaushika. There are also the Sarvatirtha, the Kusharanya tirtha - where the Bhima river begins to flow eastward, and the Jyanakund.

Worship
Bhimashankar is an ancient shrine and one of the 12 Jyotirlingas of Shiva. Bhimashankar is a pilgrim's paradise because it is far from the noise of cities and can be seen through the white clouds. The dense forests surrounding the high ranges are an abode for rare species of flora and fauna. Situated at the extreme end of the Sahyadri Ranges, this place gives a wonderful view of the world around the local rivers and hill stations.

Bhimashankar is the source of the Bhima River, which flows southeast and merges with the Krishna River.

It seems as if Lord Shiva is keeping a silent vigil over the majestic ranges of the Sahyadris. Bhimashankar is a trekker's delight and a traveler's sojourn, with only the silent murmur of the cool breeze and the occasional chirping of birds breaking the silence.

City details
The Khed (Rajgurunagar) is the administrative taluka that comprises the upper parts of the Ghod and Bhima rivers in the Pune district. The Bhimashankar Temple is located at Bhorgiri, 50 kilometres north-northwest of Khed. It is 127 kilometres from Pune in the Ghat region of the Sahyadri highlands. Also located there is the Bhimashankar Wildlife Sanctuary. It is approximately 130 kilometres by road from Pune to Manchar. Bhimashankar is in the district of Pune.

Connectivity
Nearest Airport: Pune

Nearest Railway Station: Pune Junction

Roadways: With government buses, it takes about 4 to 5 hours to get from the Pune Shivajinagar bus terminal to Bhimashankar, which is 60 kilometres away and goes through Manchar. There are also buses that go from Manchar to Bhimashankar Jyotirlinga, but they don't run very often. Travellers can book their bus tickets online through MSRTC (Maharashtra's official government website). Manchar is a hub for Bhimashankar because of its proximity to national highways. Those travelling from Nashik can disembark at Manchar and board a bus to Bhimashankar. Private vehicles (parked behind the Manchar bus station) are available to Bhimashankar for carpooling.

In proximity to the temple or the Bhimashankar bus station, there are very few or no private lodgings. MTDC Bhimashankar is located post-Rajpur, at Tal Ambegoan, 5 kilometres from the Bhimashankar bus stand. Only those with their own vehicles will find it easy to stay here, as transportation between the temple and MTDC will be nearly impossible, or else one has to walk a couple of hours. However, few private, independent houses are accessible for lodging because they are remote.

Other Facilities
Numerous excellent restaurants are accessible for dining. Few convenience stores carry basic medications for medical emergencies, however, a nice drugstore may be located 14 kilometres away in Taleghar. Individuals are required to arrange their own transportation or use government buses.

Steps to reach the temple
There are two ways to reach the temple from the Bhimashankar bus stand: either by stairs or by roadways. Approximately 100 steps go down to the Bhimashankar temple from the Bhimashankar bus stand. A doli (palanquin) is available to individuals who are unable to ascend stairs. Also, one can organize transportation that drops them off close to the Sri Rama Temple, which is adjacent to the Bhimashankar Temple.

History

Even though the Bhimashankaram shrine and the Bhimarathi river have been talked about in writings as far back as the 13th century, the current construction of the temple seems to be fairly new. The Nagara architectural style was used to build this temple, which was built in the 18th century. It is small and elegant. 

It is claimed that the old temple was built on a Swayambhu Lingam (that is, the self-emanating Shiva Lingam). Furthermore, it can be seen that the Lingam is located precisely in the center of the Garbagriham (Sanctum sanctorum) of the temple. The pillars and door frames of the temple are covered with intricate sculptures of holy beings and people. In these amazing carvings, scenes from mythology are depicted.

A minor shrine dedicated to Lord Shani Mahatma can also be seen within the temple's grounds (also called Shanaeshwara). There is a statue of Nandi, Lord Shiva's vehicle, right inside the entrance to the temple.

This temple is connected to the legend of how Shiva killed Tripurasura, the demon, with the unconquerable flying citadels known as "Tripuras." On the peak of the Sahyadri hills, Shiva is claimed to have assumed the form of "Bhima Shankara" at the behest of the Gods, and the sweat that spilled from His body after the battle is said to have formed the Bhimarathi river.

The Gopura-shikhara of the temple was built by Nāna Phadnavis. It is said that the great Maratha king Shivaji gave gifts to this temple so that religious ceremonies could be done better. The "Shani Temple" is situated within the main complex of the Bhimashankar temple.

Between the two pillars in front of the "Shani" shrine there is an enormous antique Portuguese bell. Behind the temple, there is a narrow walk that goes to the riverbanks. Outside the temple, there is a large area of forest that is sometimes broken up by forts on the mountains nearby.

There are other temples and shrines, near the main temple. There is a shrine to Kamalaja near the Bhimashankar temple. Kamalaja is an incarnation of Parvathi, who aided Shiva in his battle against Tripuraasura. Kamalajaa was worshipped with offerings of lotus flowers by Brahma.

There is a shrine for Siva Ganams, Shaakini and Daakini who assisted Shiva in the battle against the demon Bhima. Kaushika Maha Muni is said to have done 'tapas' (penance) there. The place where he bathed is called Mokshakund tirtham, which is located behind the Bhimashankar temple. There are also the Sarvatirtha, the Kusharanya tirtha - where the Bhīmā river begins to flow eastward, and the Jnyanakund.

References

Notes

 
 
 .

External links

https://www.bhimashankar.org.in
 https://web.archive.org/web/20150519081020/http://www.shinoli.com/bhimashankar/
 https://web.archive.org/web/20150407214954/http://bhimashankar.shinoli.com/
 https://templeknowledge.com/about-shree-bhimashankar-temple/
 https://web.archive.org/web/20080706012358/http://www.maharashtratourism.gov.in/mtdc/HTML/MaharashtraTourism/TouristDelight/Shrines/Shrines.aspx?strpage=Jyotrilingas_Bhimashankar.html
 https://web.archive.org/web/20090604021424/http://pune.gov.in/tourism/tour_rel.html

Hindu temples in Maharashtra
Jyotirlingas
Hindu temples in Pune district
Shiva temples in Maharashtra
Temples in India